Blaž Lenger (December 6, 1919 - September 26, 2006) was a performer of traditional folk songs from northern Croatia, especially the region of Podravina.

Biography and career
He was educated in the village of Podravske Sesvete. From early childhood he was oriented towards music thanks to his mother and father whose love of music influenced him greatly. As soon as he was old enough, he started performing with the local musical group Vlašički. The first instrument he played was the accordion but he soon switched to bass (bajs), a rhythm instrument that matched his strong voice. Later he joined the Štef Ivančan music group in Novo Virje, where he gained enough experience to form his own group. His new group was named after him: Lengeri. The group performed at music festivals, on radio and television, and recorded cassettes and records. Their first recorded song was "Podravino moja mila", followed by "Potočić maleni", "Alaj je divan taj podravski kraj" and a polka "Ruža, ruža".

Lenger retired in 1977 but never stopped singing. He was a member to the day he died of a singing group from Podravske Sesvete named after him, Blaž Lenger. He died on September 26, 2006, at home in Draganci, and was buried in the village cemetery in Podravske Sesvete.

Sources

Blaž Lenger - život i djelo 

1919 births
2006 deaths
20th-century Croatian male singers
Yugoslav male singers